Gunak may refer to:
 Gunak, Fars
 Gunak, Irandegan, Khash County, Sistan and Baluchestan Province
 Gunak, Eskelabad, Khash County, Sistan and Baluchestan Province